Dalmanitina is an extinct genus of trilobite in the family Dalmanitidae. There are about seven described species in Dalmanitina.

Species
These seven species belong to the genus Dalmanitina:
 † Dalmanitina acuta Hammann, 1971
 † Dalmanitina destombesi (Henry, 1965)
 † Dalmanitina osiris
 † Dalmanitina philippoti Henry, 1980
 † Dalmanitina tellecheai (Harrington & Leanza, 1957)
 † Dalmanitina wagneri
 † Dalmanitina socialis (Barrande, 1846)

References

Dalmanitidae
Fossils of the Czech Republic
Letná Formation
Articles created by Qbugbot